"The Songs I Love" is a popular song with music written by Jimmy Van Heusen and lyrics by Sammy Cahn. The song was published in 1963. The song was composed for a Perry Como album of the same name.

References

Songs with music by Jimmy Van Heusen
Songs with lyrics by Sammy Cahn
1963 songs
Perry Como songs